Peter Schärer is a Swiss bobsledder who competed in the early 1970s. He won four medals in the four-man event at the FIBT World Championships with three golds (1971, 1973, 1975) and one bronze (1970).

References
Bobsleigh four-man world championship medalists since 1930

Possibly living people
Swiss male bobsledders
Year of birth missing (living people)
20th-century Swiss people